Harvard-Yenching may refer to:
 Harvard–Yenching Library
 Harvard–Yenching Institute
 Harvard–Yenching Classification